Konrad Vilhelm Mägi (1 November 1878 – 15 August 1925) was an Estonian painter, primarily known for his landscape work. He was one of the most colour-sensitive Estonian painters of the first decades of the 20th century, and Mägi's works on motifs of the island of Saaremaa are the first modern Estonian nature paintings.

Life and works
Mägi received his elementary art education from the drawing courses of the German Artisans' Society of Tartu (1899–1902.) At the same time, he was keenly engaged in theater, violin, and various sports.

Mägi continued his art education as an unattached student in Saint Petersburg (1903–1905), studying under Amandus Adamson. In the autumn of 1907, he went to Paris. There Mägi studied at a free academy. From 1908 to 1910, he lived in Norway. In 1912, Mägi returned to Tartu, where he worked as an art teacher.

In Åland, he created delicate plant vignettes in the style of Art Nouveau: Kahekesi (Two together; 1908; China ink drawing). In Paris, Mägi was influenced by Impressionism and Fauvism, which had a significant impact on his colours: Lilleline väli majakesega (A flower field with a little house; 1908–1909), Norra maastik männiga (A Norwegian landscape with a pine; 1910).

From 1918, the influence of Expressionism is manifest, fostered by Mägi's extreme sensitivity and emotional response to the anxious times: Pühajärv (Lake Püha); (1918–1920), Otepää maastik (Landscape of Otepää); (1918–1920). Also influenced by Expressionism are his big figure compositions Pietà (1919), Kolgata (Golgatha) (1921).

Mägi's new artistic period, begun on a trip to Italy, brought calmer tempers: Varemed Capril (Ruins in Capri; 1922–1923). Along with nature pictures, he painted flowers and portraits. Mägi's mostly beautiful female models express the Art Nouveau ideal of beauty: Holsti (1916). In his later portraits from the 1920s, a more serious temper is expressed: Madonna (1923–1924).

Gallery

See also
Culture of Estonia

References

External links

Konrad Mägi, Official homepage
Works by Konrad Mägi at the Art Museum of Estonia

1878 births
1925 deaths
People from Elva Parish
People from the Governorate of Livonia
Art Nouveau painters
Modern painters
Expressionist painters
19th-century Estonian painters
19th-century Estonian male artists
20th-century Estonian painters
20th-century Estonian male artists